Paige Renee Spiranac (born March 26, 1993) is an American social media personality, golf instructor, and former professional golfer. She played Division 1 college golf at both the University of Arizona and San Diego State University, winning All-Mountain West Conference honors during the 2012–13 and 2013–14 seasons, and leading the Aztecs to their first Mountain West Conference Championship in 2015.

Early life
Spiranac was born in Wheat Ridge, Colorado, to a family of Croatian descent. Her father, Dan, was a member of the University of Pittsburgh Panthers football team, which won the 1976 national college championship. Her mother, Annette, was a professional ballerina. Her older sister, Lexie, also received a college athletic scholarship, competing on Stanford's track team.

Spiranac grew up in Monument, Colorado, where she practiced gymnastics in hopes of competing in the Olympics.  At 12, a twice-broken kneecap derailed her gymnastics dreams and pushed her towards golf. Spiranac split time between Scottsdale, Arizona, and Monument, Colorado, as a home-schooled student, so that she would have time to train.

Junior, amateur, and college golf career

Junior golf
In her early golf career, Spiranac won five tournaments in seven tries on Colorado's junior golf circuit, including the 2010 CWGA Junior Stroke Play, en route to becoming a top-20 junior player in the world, a top-5 college recruit, and a two-time West Region Player of the Year and first-team All-American as a member of the Future Collegians World Tour. This earned her a golf scholarship from the University of Arizona.

College golf
In Spiranac's freshman year, 2011–2012, she competed in three events for the University of Arizona Wildcats during their golf season: the Windy City Intercollegiate, the Pac-12/SEC Challenge, and the Wildcat Invitational. Her best score of the year was a 73, shot twice during the Windy City Intercollegiate.

Spiranac transferred to San Diego State for her sophomore year. Improved success followed in the 2012–2013 season, with First-Team All-Mountain West honors, a fifth-place finish at the Cal Classic, a sixth at the Mountain West Championship, and nineteenth at the NCAA Central Regional Championships. Her 2013–2014 junior season resulted in Second-Team All-Mountain West Honors, along with one top ten finish at the Mountain West Championship. Her senior season ended with the Aztecs' first Mountain West Conference Championship in school history, which she described as "one of the absolute happiest moments of my life."

In July 2015 the Colorado Golf Association hosted the 100th Colorado Women's Golf Association Match Play Championship at Raccoon Creek Golf Course. In a 35-hole title match against Brittany Fan of the University of Colorado Boulder, Spiranac won, finishing nine strokes under par.

Professional golf

Cactus Tour
Spiranac debuted on the developmental Cactus Tour at the Las Colinas club in Queen Creek, Arizona, in May 2016. In her third start, a sudden-death win at Scottsdale's Orange Tree Country Club over Hannah O’Sullivan, the then top-ranked amateur in the world, earned Spiranac her first tour win.

She next finished ninth at Stallion Mountain, earning an $800 prize. At the Aliante Golf Club, in June, Spiranac finished 17th out of 52 golfers, her twelve-over-par score netting a $575 prize. In July, she finished eight-over-par for a seventh-place finish at Walnut Creek in Mansfield, Texas, earning $600.  Also in July, she made the cut at the Scottish Open in the Ladies' European Tour. 

Spiranac competed in the August/September 2016 CoBank Colorado Women's Open, placing ninth at one-under-par and earning $1,750.

In September 2016, Spiranac finished in a three-way second-place tie at Legacy in Phoenix, Arizona; her second-best finish of the year, earning $935. A two-under-par final round produced another top-five finish at Trilogy, in October, and $800. She ended the season with $8,010 in winnings.

LPGA attempt
In August 2016, Spiranac competed in her first LPGA Qualifying Tournament, but did not earn a card to play on the professional circuit. In 2022, discussing Marshall football's upset of Notre Dame, she joked "Notre Dame is as bad as I was playing professional golf".

In business
Spiranac has been featured in magazines such as the Sports Illustrated Swimsuit edition and Golf Digest. She began writing a monthly column in Golf Magazine, with the December 2018 issue.

In 2017, Spiranac signed with Parsons Xtreme Golf (PXG) to represent its golf clubs in social media and television ads. That year, she also became a brand ambassador for 18Birdies to help market its golf app nationwide. She also has signed deals with Mizzen + Main and Philip Stein Watches.

In 2021, Spiranac joined PointsBet, a global sportsbook operator, as a brand ambassador and on-air personality. According to the official announcement, she also took an equity stake in the company and became a "significant" shareholder.

In June 2022, Spiranac was named as the 'Sexiest Woman Alive' in the Maxim's 2022 Hot 100 list and she was the first athlete to attain the No.1 spot in the Hot 100 list. In January 2023, Spiranac launched the "OnlyPaige" website, which offers subscriber-only content, including instructional content and never-before-seen photos.

In social media
Spiranac's self-promotion has received criticism for "sexualizing women's golf". She sought to use the exposure to promote her anti-cyberbullying campaign and continue to fight for a woman's right to feel comfortable in her own skin.

The LPGA Tour introduced a stricter dress code in July 2017, restricting plunging necklines, leggings, and short skirts. This triggered immediate criticism, characterized by the Fox Sports headline "LPGA slammed for 'slut-shaming' its own players after new dress code restrictions revealed". Spiranac spoke against it in a Fortune magazine op-ed piece, "The Progression of Women's Golf Is Plunging Further than Our Necklines", which appeared just days after the LPGA announcement.

In February 2020, Spiranac started a podcast, Playing-A-Round with Paige Renee.

Personal life
In 2018, Spiranac was married to Steven Tinoco. On March 7, 2022, she announced that she was no longer married.

References

External links

American female golfers
San Diego State Aztecs women's golfers
Arizona Wildcats women's golfers
Golf writers and broadcasters
Golfers from Denver
American people of Croatian descent
1993 births
Living people